Smirnov (masculine) or Smirnova (feminine) is one of the two most common surnames in Russia. Smirnov is derived from an adjectival nickname smirnyj (in archaic form smirnoy), that means "quiet, still, peaceful, gentle".

Smirnov
Aleksandr Smirnov (disambiguation), multiple people
Aleksandr Petrovich Smirnov (1877–1938), Russian old Bolshevik revolutionary and Soviet statesman
Alexei Smirnov (physicist) (born 1951), Russian particle physicist
Alexey Smirnov (disambiguation), multiple people
Anatoly Smirnov (disambiguation), multiple people
Andrei Smirnov (disambiguation), multiple people
Anton Smirnov (disambiguation), multiple people
Artem Smirnov (tennis) (born 1988), Ukrainian tennis player
Artyom Aleksandrovich Smirnov (born 1989), Russian footballer
Boris Smirnov (disambiguation), multiple people
Danila Smirnov (born 2001), Russian football player
Daniil Smirnov, Russian Paralympic swimmer
Denys Smirnov (born 1975), Ukrainian footballer
Dmitry Smirnov (disambiguation), multiple people
Eulogius (Smirnov) (1937–2020), Russian Orthodox prelate
Evgeny Smirnov (born 1987), Ukrainian DJ and producer known by his stage name Omnia
Gennady Mikhailovich Smirnov (1955–2000), Soviet footballer
Grigory Sergeyevich Smirnov (born 1997), Russian competitive ice dancer
Igor Smirnov (disambiguation), multiple people
Ilya Smirnov (1887–1964), Soviet army general
Ivan Smirnov (disambiguation), multiple people
Karin Smirnov (1880–1973), Finnish Swedish author and daughter of August Strindberg
Konstantin Smirnov (1854–1930), general of the Imperial Russian Army
Konstantin Smirnov (military Orientalist) (1877–1938), military Orientalist of the Imperial Russian Army
Leonid Smirnov (footballer) (1889–1980), Russian football player
Leonid Smirnov (politician) (1916–2001), Soviet politician and engineer
Lev Smirnov (1911–1986), Soviet statesman and jurist
Maksim Smirnov (born 1979), Estonian football midfielder
Mikhail Smirnov (disambiguation), multiple people
Nikolai Smirnov (disambiguation), multiple people
Oleg Smirnov (disambiguation), multiple people
Pavel Smirnov (1882–1947), Russian chess player
Pyotr Arsenievich Smirnov (1831–1898), Russian businessman, founder of the Smirnoff vodka brand
Pyotr Smirnov (1897–1939), Soviet Commissar, Deputy Minister of Defense and Commander of the Soviet Navy
Roman Smirnov (disambiguation), multiple people
Sergey Smirnov (disambiguation), multiple people
Stanislav Smirnov (born 1970), mathematician
Valentin Smirnov (born 1986), Russian middle distance runner
Valentin Panteleimonovich Smirnov (born 1937), nuclear fusion physicist
Vasily Smirnov (disambiguation), multiple people
Vitali Smirnov (born 1935), Russian member of the International Olympic Committee
Vladimir Smirnov (disambiguation), multiple people
Yanaki Smirnov (born 1992), Bulgarian footballer 
Yevhen Smirnov (born 1993), Ukrainian football midfielder
Yuriy Smirnov (disambiguation), also Yuri Smirnov; multiple people

Smirnova
Alexandra Smirnova (1809–1882) Russian lady-in-waiting
Galina Konstantinovna Smirnova (1910–1980), Russian composer
Lyudmila Smirnova (born 1949), Russian figure skater
Mariya Smirnova (1920–2002), Russian military pilot
Sophia Smirnova (1852–1921), Russian writer
Svetlana Smirnova (sport shooter) (born 1962), Russian sport shooter
Svetlana Smirnova (actor) (born 1956), Russian actor
Tamara Mikhaylovna Smirnova, astronomer
Yekaterina Smirnova (born 1956), Soviet heptathlete

Other variations
 Smirnoff (surname), variant of transliteration
 Smirnovs, Latvian form
 Smirnovas, Lithuanian form
 Smirnow, variant of transliteration
 Ukrainian forms: the Russian surname Смирнов may be rendered either as Смирнов (Smyrnov) or Смірнов (Smirnov).

See also

References

Russian-language surnames

fi:Smirnov